The 2003 Yobe State gubernatorial election occurred on April 19, 2003. ANPP candidate Bukar Ibrahim won the election, defeating PDP Adamu Waziri and 3 other candidates.

Results
Bukar Ibrahim from the ANPP won the election. 5 candidates contested in the election.

The total number of registered voters in the state was 966,749, valid votes was 560,576.

Bukar Ibrahim, (ANPP)- 368,806

Adamu Waziri, PDP- 188,262

AD- 2,404

Yakubu Bello, NDP- 786

Muhammed Tsoho, UNPP- 318

References 

Yobe State gubernatorial election
Yobe State gubernatorial election
2003